Cherkassky, or Cherkasskaya (Черкасская; feminine), may refer to: 

Mikhail Cherkassky (died 1571), Russian voyevoda and notable oprichnik
Yakov Cherkassky (died 1666), Russian statesman and military figure
Prince Alexander Bekovich-Cherkassky (died 1717), Russian officer who led the first Russian military expedition into Central Asia
Alexey Cherkassky (1680–1742), Russian statesman
Maria Cherkassky (1696–1747), lady-in-waiting from the Russian Empire, Trubetskoy family and House of Cherkasskiy 
Vladimir Cherkassky (1821–1878), Russian public figure
Ekaterina Cherkassky (Vasilchikova) (1825–1888), House of Vasilchikov and House of Cherkasskiy
Maria Nikolaevna Cherkassky (died 1892), House of Tcherbatov and House of Cherkasskiy
Abram Cherkassky (1886–1967), Ukrainian/Soviet painter
Shura Cherkassky (1909–1995), Russian-born American classical pianist 
 

Circassian dynasties